Mustafa Hassan Mohamed (born 1 March 1979) is a Swedish long-distance runner who mainly competes in the 3000 meter steeplechase.

Personal life
Mohamed was born in 1979 in Mogadishu, Somalia. He later moved to Sweden at the age of 11, eventually becoming a Swedish citizen. He presently lives in Lysekil.

Athletic career

Having finished eighth for Sweden at the 1998 World Junior Championships, Mohamed progressed significantly over the next few years. In 2003, he lowered his personal best time from 8:32 to 8:23 in the 3000 meter steeplechase. He later ran the event in 8:18.05 minutes at the 2004 Olympics.

Mohamed reached the podium three times at the Nordic Cross Country Championships: first winning a bronze in the men's junior race at the inaugural edition in 1997, then going on to win a silver medal in the senior race in 2003, and finally taking the gold in 2006. He won at the Eurocross meeting in 2006, and then went on to take a bronze medal at the 2006 European Cross Country Championships later in the year.

At the 2005 World Championships, Mohamed finished tenth. He improved upon that the following year in Stockholm with a time of 8:14.67. A month later in August 2006, he finished fourth at the 2006 European Athletics Championships.

On 28 July 2007, Mohamed posted a time of 8:05.75, thereby beating the 31-year-old Swedish record. Later that season, he finished fourth in the 2007 World Championships.

On 21 June 2009, Mohamed competed in and took home gold at the 1st SPAR European Team Championships in Leiria, Portugal.

At the 2010 Swedish Athletics Championships, he completed a triple long-distance victory by winning the 3000 m steeplechase, 5000 metres, and 10,000 metres. This made him only the second man to complete the feat, after Dan Glans' 1976 wins.

In 2012, Mohamed made his debut over the marathon distance at the Hamburg Marathon. He finished in the top ten with a time of 2:12:28 hours.

In 2020, he beat the 36-year-old Swedish record on marathon by running on 2:10:03 in Sevilla.

Notes

External links

1979 births
Living people
Sportspeople from Mogadishu
Somalian male long-distance runners
Somalian male marathon runners
Swedish male long-distance runners
Swedish male marathon runners
Swedish male steeplechase runners
Olympic athletes of Sweden
Athletes (track and field) at the 2004 Summer Olympics
Athletes (track and field) at the 2008 Summer Olympics
World Athletics Championships athletes for Sweden
Somalian emigrants to Sweden
Swedish people of Somali descent